Sir Patrick Barnewall, 3rd Baronet (c.1630 – after 1695) was an Irish Jacobite politician and baronet. 

Barnewall was the son of Sir Richard Barnewall, 2nd Baronet and Julia Lettice Aylmer, and on 6 July 1679 he succeeded to his father's baronetcy. He is recorded as being granted a pension of £150 per year from Charles II of England. Barnewall was the Member of Parliament for Meath in the Irish House of Commons in the Patriot Parliament of 1689. That year he received a grant of 1,261 acres of land in County Galway in recognition of his adherence to James II of England.

He married Frances, youngest daughter of Richard Butler of Kilcash, with whom he had five children. Barnewall was succeeded in his title by his son, George.

References

Year of birth uncertain
17th-century Anglo-Irish people
Baronets in the Baronetage of Ireland
Irish Jacobites
Irish MPs 1689
Members of the Parliament of Ireland (pre-1801) for Queen's County constituencies